Nellipoyil  is a village and is part of Kodancherry Panchayat in Kozhikode district in the state of Kerala, India.
Nearest Places are Kodencheri, Thiruvambady, Thamarassery, Thusharagiri Falls. It is under Thiruvambady Assembly Constituency. Areeppara and Thusharagiri are the main tourist spots in Nellipoyil village, Kerala. Two streams originating from the Western Ghats meet in Thusharagiri to form the River Challipuzha and the river has three waterfalls in it: two of which are in the forest and the third right at the border of the forest.
The other river, Iruvanjipuzha of the Ennu Ninte Moideen movie fame, has two waterfalls: Arippara and Pathankayam, with both being utilized for hydro electric projects also. Both are famous tourist attractions.

It is a plantation destination that abounds in rubber, arecanut, cocoa and spices like pepper, ginger and nutmeg.
Though the population is diverse, Nellipoyil  is a hub of Christians mainly Saint Thomas Christians It is known as mini Kottayam as most of the people are migrated from different parts of Kottayam.

Demographics
 India census, Nellipoyil had a population of 11721 with 5805 males and 5916 females.

References

External links
Manjuvayal Church

Thamarassery area